Mohammad Jafar Mahallati is an Iranian scholar of Islamic studies and a former diplomat. He is currently serving as the Nancy Schrom Dye Chair in Middle East and North African Studies at Oberlin College in Oberlin, Ohio. He was Iran's ambassador and Permanent Representative to the United Nations from 1987 to 1989.

Life
Born in Tehran, Mahallati initially studied economics at the National University of Iran and civil engineering at the University of Kansas in the US. Later, he obtained a master's in political economy from the University of Oregon and earned his PhD in Islamic studies from McGill University in Canada. Serving as the chair of the department of economics in Kerman University for a year, Mahallati became a diplomat and spent a decade working with the United Nations.  During his tenure in that position he helped cover up crimes against humanity committed by the regime. He played a major role in adopting the Security Council Resolution 598 which brought the Iran-Iraq war to an end. Returning to his academic career, Mahallati taught at various institutions including Columbia, Princeton, Yale, and Georgetown. In 2007, he joined the Oberlin College and is still serving as the Presidential Scholar in Islamic Studies and the Nancy Schrom Dye Chair in Middle East and North African Studies.

Accusation

Crimes Against Humanity 
In 2017, Amnesty International published an investigation of the 1988 executions of Iranian political prisoners, documenting how Mahallati denied that Iran was conducting mass executions during his tenure as Permanent Representative to the United Nations. “Amnesty International issued at least 16 Urgent Actions between August and December 1988 and mobilized its activists to send tens of thousands of appeals to the head of Iran’s Supreme Judicial Council and other senior government figures, as well as Iran’s diplomatic representatives in different countries, calling on the authorities to end executions of imprisoned political dissidents immediately.” Instead, Iranian authorities including Mahallati responded by “systematically denying the mass killings.” Mahallati also alleged that the 1988 executions were "battlefield killings" and called the United Nation's resolution expressing concern over the matter "unjust" because it was based on "fake information" released by "a terrorist organization in Iraq."

On October 7, 2020, a group of former Iranian political prisoners and human rights activists sent a letter to the president of Oberlin College demanding that the college terminate Mahallati's employment. Referencing the Amnesty International report, the letter argued he intended to "obfuscate and lie to the international community about mass crimes perpetrated by the Iranian regime." On October 10, 2020, Mahallati responded to this allegation, saying, "The accusers fail to provide a single solid document as evidence of my actual knowledge of these incidents. With no concrete evidence, they infer that I must have been informed of and intentionally denied these atrocities. I categorically deny any knowledge and therefore responsibility regarding mass executions in Iran when I was serving at the United Nations."

Mahallati's Letters 
Mahallati’s continued public denial of responsibility or knowledge of the crimes against humanity did not end the effort to bring him to justice. Activists, students, and faculty continued to demand a response from the college.  “Oberlin College is facing fresh criticism for continuing to give a platform to a so-called "professor of peace," Mohammad Jafar Mahallati…” The continued pressure prompted Mahallati to write a letter to Oberlin’s Dean where his arguments have changed. Where previously he had argued no knowledge, he instead said as a diplomat he was only doing his job being a spokesman for the Regime, and therefore he should be granted diplomatic immunity for any words or wrong doing. “I was doing my job, delivering the official statements of Iran to the U.N. U.N. envoys cannot defy their official mandates to pursue their personal agendas and opinions. In the rare cases that they do, they get fired from their positions if not labeled as political traitors.”

His story was very different in a letter he wrote to the Iranian parliament declaring his continued loyalty and support to the regime in 2018. “Mahallati emphasized his loyalty and utility to the Islamic Republic of Iran. Writing in Persian to the Iranian parliament, Mahallati told a very different story from the one he tells in English to the Oberlin community.” In this letter addressed to Ali Larijani, Mahallati continues by insinuating his intention to influence students in favor of the Islamic Regime.

Oberlin College's Response 
To investigate the matter, Oberlin hired a law firm to review Mahallati's case which came to the conclusion that there was no support to these accusations. On November 2, 2021, protestors demanded Oberlin provide "full transparency of (Mahallati's) criminal past" and graphically reenacted the Iranian trials on the college's campus.

Student Response 
The Editorial Board of the Oberlin College's Newspaper agrees with the protesters in an article originally published in November 2021.

"Iran has so successfully obfuscated its crimes against humanity — through mouthpieces like Mahallati and many others — that it has been able to continue perpetrating such crimes to the present day. Most egregiously, Mahallati’s rhetoric about the Baha’is laid the groundwork for Iran to commit genocide against the Baha’i community. To this day, Baha’is are systematically persecuted, tortured, and killed in Iran.

“The College’s failure to mention whether it included other persecuted groups in its investigation — and to address Mahallati’s anti-Baha’i statements — means that it is participating in the erasure of history. The College’s actions inadvertently aid Iran in its efforts to conceal its decades-long record of crimes against humanity.

“We ask that the College demonstrate that it followed its due diligence to examine every piece of evidence regarding Mahallati’s involvement in covering up Iran’s crimes. We ask that the College enters into conversation with the activists who have bared their hearts to our community and who are seeking our solidarity and kindness. We ask that, after the College engages in a fair and comprehensive investigation into the allegations that have been presented, it pursues just and swift action proportionate to the investigation’s findings.

“For Oberlin faculty, many of whom know Mahallati personally, we ask that you remember that your individual judgment of his character does not absolve him of his past. You’re all researchers. Look at the facts. Read the records. Ask yourself, if Mahallati was a professor at a different university — one you had no connection to — would you support further investigation? Would you give him the benefit of the doubt, against all available evidence?

“We have also been disappointed to see the lack of student engagement on this issue. While student groups mobilize at the drop of a hat for other causes they deem worthy of fighting for, not one student or organization on campus has made this issue a priority. Students, you speak so much about allyship and activism — where is your solidarity for your Iranian friends?

“This Editorial Board harbors no hatred for Professor Mahallati, nor do we wish him any ill will. We merely ask that the College acts in good faith and is transparent with the student body about its ongoing justice process."

Students not affiliated with the school’s newspaper show growing support for the effort to remove Mahallati from his position. One student said “I hope that because it’s Commencement, people who aren’t students will pay attention…I think Oberlin College has failed these [Mahallati] protestors in a lot of ways.” People are starting to pay more attention. The activists continue to gain “lots of support from students, parents and some alumni who were dismayed by the whole situation that such a person [Mahallati] is at the school and the administration is whitewashing it.” During a protest in June 2022 “at least two-thirds of the graduating students turned their back on the chairman of the Oberlin College board of trustees, Chris Canavan, because of allegations of union-busting, failure to pay the faculty fair salaries…[and] the Mahallati affair.”

Academic Response 
As well as gaining traction amongst the student body at Oberlin College, the awareness of Mahallati’s crimes and complacency is spread by experts in academia and journalism. Many have communicated the same message: Mahallati and other Islamic regime sympathizers are complicit in covering up crimes against humanity. “Writing in the September 23 issue of the student newspaper Oberlin Review, Dr. Mansour Farhang, a professor of Politics at Bennington College and the Islamic Republic of Iran’s first ambassador to the U.N., slammed Mahallati "as an agent of Iran’s totalitarian theocracy" who refuses to recognize the clerical regime’s mass murder of innocent Iranian political prisoners in 1988.”

Frieda Fuchs, a former visiting professor in the [Oberlin] college’s political science department, discussed the appearance of pro-Mahallati counter-protestors who were clearly in place to oppose and accuse activists. “Three pro-Mahallati protesters carried ‘Stop Political Racism’ signs….Oberlin’s administrators have bought into the story that Mahallati is a soft-spoken professor of peace who is the victim of a well-funded and orchestrated smear campaign launched against him by right-wing Zionist and Iranian pro-Republican warmongers.” That story being the standard defense of Mahallati along with his denial of any knowledge or responsibility.

“Fuchs continued, ‘It is hard to understand why a school that prides itself on a history of supporting political freedoms and social justice for disadvantaged groups persistently refuses to engage with the relatives of the victims of Iran’s dictatorial regime, most of whom came from the political left.’” 

Mahallati is grouped with other “pro-Iranian regime academics” by Iranian expert and journalist Karmel Melamed, “colleges in America employ pro-Islamic Republic officials like Mohammad Mahallati, who have covered up human rights abuses by the Islamic Republic of Iran, spread pro-Islamic Republic messages to college students in classes, and refused to denounce the regime today.” Similar sentiments are shown by Benjamin Weinthal: “Critics argue that Mahallati’s revolutionary zeal is still intact and that he embodies the Islamic Republic of Iran’s violent and imperialistic ideology. Experts and academics all over the USA demonstrate Mahallati’s responsibility in covering up the crimes against humanity committed by the Iranian Islamic Regime.

Government Response 
In September 2021 the work of activists brought the issue to the U.S. government. “The Department of Education’s Office for Civil Rights is evaluating a complaint against Oberlin College that cites Mahallati’s glorification of jihadism terrorism in his classes. The United States government – under Democratic and Republican presidents – has classified Iran’s regime as the world’s worst state sponsor of terrorism.”

In June 2022, the U.S. Government became more actively involved in the investigation of Mahallati. “Len Khodorkovsky, a former deputy assistant secretary of state and senior adviser to the U.S. special representative for Iran, traveled to Oberlin for the [Mahallati Protest] demonstration, which was held during the college’s graduation weekend.

“He tweeted, ‘It’s unconscionable for @oberlincollege to continue employing Mohammad Jafar Mahallati, former Iranian regime official complicit in the #1988massacre of 5000+ Iranians. Oberlin’s Board of Trustees should be concerned about the reputational damage this is inflicting on the school.’”

In September 2022, two U.S. Representatives on the Committee on Education and Labor sent a formal letter to Oberlin College requesting information for an investigation into Mahallati and his remaining ties to the Islamic Republic of Iran: "Mr. Mahallati’s current association with and his open loyalty to the Iranian regime causes serious national security concerns. It also puts into question Oberlin’s reporting of foreign funding: any omissions from this report would violate section 117 of the Higher Education Act" wrote Rep. Jim Banks, R-Ind and Rep Virginia Foxx, R-NC in a letter to Oberlin College President Carmen Twillie Ambar and Oberlin’s Board of Trustees.” Rep. Foxx later emphasized Mahallati’s concerning position at Oberlin due to the fact that he has previous and current ties to terrorist groups, and has likely been tied to money transfer from the Iranian government to some American institutions. “[Oberlin College’s] stark unwillingness to denounce Mohammad Mahallati’s ties to Iran’s maligned regime raises serious concerns over national security and the ideals of an institution receiving millions in U.S. taxpayer dollars. At best, it's blind ignorance. At worst, it’s an illustration that Oberlin gives priority to providing academic refuge to a man whose interests are aligned with terrorists..."

Besides Mahallati’s continued support of the current Iranian regime- which is considered a state sponsor of terrorism by the U.S.A., there is direct evidence suggesting he was getting funded for his continued “loyalty and utility” to the regime. Before Mahallati became a professor at Oberlin College in 2007 he “began his academic career in the U.S. at Columbia University in 1991 after serving as an Iranian diplomat in the 1980s. Mahallati has also taught at Princeton, Georgetown, and Yale. Three of the five schools he has taught at —Columbia, Georgetown, and Princeton — received funds from the Alavi Foundation, an Iranian charity which was successfully prosecuted by the U.S. Department of Justice for serving as a front group for the Iranian government in 2017.” There are also links between Mahallati and other Antisemitism Islamic extremist groups including Hamas and Hezbollah. The U.S. Government is recognizing that Mahallati is responsible for crimes against humanity in his continued support of the Islamic Republic of Iran and his denial of the atrocities he helped cover up in the 80s.

Anti-Semitism 
“Since October [2020], Mahallati has also been accused of anti-Semitism in Fox News and The Jerusalem Post for his statements in support of Palestine during his time as ambassador.
‘Palestine is an Islamic territory, and Islamic heritage, and it remains an Islamic point of identity,” Mahallati said in a statement to the UN on Feb. 14, 1989. “The land of Palestine is the platform of the ascension of the Prophet Mohammad; its significance is that it contains the first Qibla direction — towards which Muslims prayed. Its occupation by Zionist usurpers is a transgression against all Muslims of the world and its liberation is therefore a great religious obligation and commitment.’” Mahallati shows his anti-Semitism by denying the sovereignty of Isreal as a recognized nation and using words such as “usurpers” and “liberation” to suggest they need to be removed. Karmel Melamed explains further in this article from August 2022: “‘there is a growing trend among certain pro-Iranian regime “academics” in major American universities to spread this vile form of Jew-hatred by hiding behind anti-Israel comments. When they attack Israel, the only nation-state of the Jewish people, they are attacking Jews.” 

Mahallati’s anti-Semitism is still apparent today. He has ties to anti-Semitic Islamic extremist groups. “In May, FWI reported on Mahallati’s presence on the board of an Iranian-based journal, Sepehr-e-Siasat, which recently praised the Iranian-backed terror group, Hezbollah, as a promoter of Shiite identity and an integral part of confronting the “Zionist regime.” The journal’s board also boasts individuals connected to the Islamic Revolutionary Guard Corps, another designated terror group. When FWI reported Mahallati’s membership on the board, Mahallati’s name disappeared from the journal’s website within a day of FWI revealing it.” 

Mahallati is using his position as a professor to influence the minds of his students. In his letter to the Iranian parliament in 2017 Mahallati mentions his “utility” to the Islamic Republic of Iran. In the letter, which is written in Farsi, he says “Currently, many students who are engaged in Islamic studies in these institutions are naturally influenced by the views of their founders” clearly his use to the regime is in converting young minds to his pro-Iranian regime, anti-Semitic way of thinking. “The issue of college professors in America blaming Israel for terrorist attacks and spreading pro-Islamic Republic messages has been significantly increasing over the past few years in the education sphere. In many public colleges, college professors and faculty continue to espouse anti-Israel and antisemitic statements against Jews while promoting or whitewashing the actions of groups like Hamas and other Palestinian terrorist movements that mirror the goals of the Islamic Republic of Iran on college campuses.” There is record of his lectures supporting Hamas to his students. “[Mahallati] continues to promote terrorism against Israeli civilians by encouraging support for Hamas among his students.”<ref name="ref13"> In several examples from student blogs from his courses, it is clear Mahallati teaches that Hamas should be “legitimized by the West” Mahallati’s anti-Sematism is clear by the pro-Iranian regime stances he maintains, by the anti-Israel positions he declares, and by his support of anti-Semitic extremest terrorists groups including Hezbollah and Hamas.

Anti-Baha'i 
Mahallati’s prejudice continues. His stance about the Baha’i community again shows his full support of the current Iranian regime. Mahallati’s rhetoric about the Baha’is laid the groundwork for Iran to commit genocide against the Baha’i community. To this day, Baha’is are systematically persecuted, tortured, and killed in Iran. In April 2021 the student paper at Oberlin College reported this article: "The Baha’i community is the largest minority religion in Iran, although the Iranian regime does not officially recognize the Baha’i Faith. In 1983, 22 Baha’is were given the death sentence for practicing their faith. These sentences and the continuing persecution of the Baha’is in Iran were discussed at the 1983 U.N. Commission on Human Rights, at which Mahallati was the Iranian representative. According to the U.N. report on the 1983 commission, while representatives from various nations and human rights organizations discussed the gravity of the situation, Mahallati denied the allegations and accused the Baha’is of terrorism in Iran.

“‘As his country had already had the opportunity of explaining, reports of arbitrary executions in Iran were complete fabrications and had been submitted to the United Nations by those very organizations which instigated terrorism in his country,’ the report states.

“Mahallati also erroneously compared the activities of the Baha’is to acts of immorality, sexual abuse, and murder; then he questioned why, in Europe and the U.S., such acts were punishable by execution, while Iran was held to different standards regarding the Baha’is.

“‘It would also be interesting to know why the European Parliament had the right to restrain the activities of the followers of certain sects and, for example, to prevent sexual abuses committed by those sects whereas his country was required to tolerate all immoral behaviour or sexual abuse, sometimes advisable according to groups such as the Baha’is, why some countries such as the United States had the right to execute murderers, while his country could not punish terrorists who burned schoolchildren and, finally, what was the definition of religion and in what way a religion differed from a sect,’ the report read."

Works
 Ethics of War and Peace in Iran and Shi'i Islam (University of Toronto Press, Scholarly Publishing Division, Nov 14, 2016)
 Friendship in Islamic Ethics and World Politics (the University of Michigan Press, 2019)

References

External links
 Official Web Page at Oberlin College

Living people
American Islamic studies scholars
Year of birth missing (living people)
Iranian diplomats
Oberlin College faculty
University of Kansas alumni
University of Oregon alumni
McGill University alumni
Muslim scholars of Islamic studies